Balls Green may refer to:

Ball's Green, a village in Gloucester, UK
Balls green, a village in West Chiltington parish

See also